Bowser's Fury is a 2021 platform game bundled in with the Nintendo Switch release of Super Mario 3D World, titled Super Mario 3D World + Bowser's Fury. The player controls Mario through Lake Lapcat to complete challenges and collect items to dispel a black sludge that is infecting the land and free Bowser from its control. Bowser's Fury gameplay is based on Super Mario 3D World.

Gameplay
Bowser's Fury is an open world platform game in which the player, as Mario, completes challenges to collect Cat Shines in order to free Bowser and Lake Lapcat from the control of the black sludge. Its core gameplay is similar to that of the 2013 platform game Super Mario 3D World, while also adopting elements introduced in Super Mario Odyssey.

Eurogamer noted the influence of Super Mario Sunshine on Bowser's Fury, from its scrappy approach to new concepts to its use of Bowser Jr. and debt to Shadow Mario challenges. GameSpot described the concept of Bowser's Fury as having put elements of Super Mario 3D World into the structure of Super Mario Odyssey. The player character Mario jumps between platforms and obstacles in a 3D environment. Each area of the world features a new gameplay twist. Mario collects bodysuit power ups that grant him special abilities, such as Fire Mario, Tanooki Mario and Boomerang Mario. In each area of Bowser's Fury, Mario collects Cat Shines by completing challenges less than 10 minutes in length, such as traversing platforms or collecting shard fragments of a Cat Shine. There are 100 Shines to collect in the game, and each self-contained area has five, displayed in a lighthouse. After collecting a Shine, the game reconfigures the area's environment to set up the next Shine's challenge. As the player progresses through the game, more areas open to the player. Mario rides the dinosaur Plessie to navigate between each island area of the archipelago and to reach Shine challenges throughout the lake's waters, outside the island areas. Unlike other Mario games, all areas of Bowser's Fury are openly accessible without use of a hub world—traditional Mario levels connected without loading screens or boundaries. Also unlike Super Mario 3D World, the player has full, unfixed camera control in Bowser's Fury and is not restricted to a limited number of "lives"—instead, when Mario dies, the player loses 50 coins from their counter, which gets reset every 100 coins due to granting Mario a power-up.

Every few minutes, Bowser's fury transforms the daytime setting of Lake Lapcat into an apocalyptic nighttime setting, with fireballs raining down toward the player. The Godzilla-esque fury event can interrupt the player's activity every few minutes, but also gives new gameplay opportunities, such as generating new platforms in the sky and using the ability to bait Bowser's fiery breath to destroy otherwise indestructible obstacles. The player can end the storm by collecting a Cat Shine, activating a lighthouse to pierce the darkness. Alternatively, the player can wait out the event or, with enough Cat Shines, choose to directly confront Bowser in a kaiju-esque battle set in a reduced scale version of Lake Lapcat. After the fury, Bowser returns to the sludge and slowly begins to rise, indicating the timing of the next fury event, as the fury event does not occur on a predictable interval. Mario is joined by Bowser Jr., whom the player can direct to interact with wall markings and, optionally, can be configured to assist the player in attacking enemies and collecting coins. Alternatively, a second player can control Bowser Jr., with the same limited ability set. Bowser Jr. also stores power-ups for the player, and allow the player to swap between the item abilities as needed.

The basic game lasts about four hours for an average player, with an additional four hours of gameplay for players interested in collecting all 100 "Cat Shines" tokens. Visually, the game displays at a reduced framerate when played in handheld mode, with drops in frame rate during chaotic on-screen action.

Plot
While on a walk, Mario discovers a mysterious black sludge M (resembling Shadow Mario's logo from Super Mario Sunshine) in the Mushroom Kingdom. After being absorbed by it, Mario finds himself in an archipelago of cat-themed islands called Lake Lapcat that have become overrun with black sludge. Upon his arrival, Mario encounters Fury Bowser, a dark version of Bowser that has grown to colossal size. Mario collects a Cat Shine, causing Bowser to retreat. Bowser Jr. appears and pleads for Mario's help to restore his father to normal, and Mario reluctantly agrees.

The two travel across Lake Lapcat in order to obtain Cat Shines, aided by Plessie the aquatic dinosaur. After obtaining a certain number of Cat Shines, Mario gains access to the Giga Bell, a super-powered variation of the Super Bell. The Giga Bell transforms Mario into Giga Cat Mario, a colossal version of his regular cat form, allowing him to battle Fury Bowser.

After using the Giga Bells to fight Fury Bowser several times, Bowser is drained of the sludge which transformed him. Despite this, he remains colossal and out of control, and steals the three Giga Bells. Mario manages to retake the Giga Bells, using all three to turn Plessie into a giant and crush Bowser. Bowser is returned to his normal size, and Bowser Jr. breaks off his alliance with Mario as the two retreat. Mario and the cats of Lake Lapcat celebrate atop the still-giant Plessie. A series of paintings by Bowser Jr. shown during the credits explain that he was responsible for accidentally creating Fury Bowser, having painted Bowser's face with his magic paintbrush while he was sleeping as a prank.

Development

Bowser's Fury was developed by Nintendo's Entertainment Planning & Development department.

Marketing and release

Bowser's Fury was first teased at the end of a trailer advertising a Super Mario 3D World re-release on Nintendo Switch during the Super Mario Bros. 35th Anniversary Nintendo Direct on September 3, 2020. At The Game Awards show in December 2020, a new commercial was showcased, though it didn't reveal any new footage of Bowser's Fury itself. On January 12, 2021, a new trailer showcased the theming, story, and gameplay of Bowser's Fury. The game was released for the Nintendo Switch on February 12, 2021. As of August 2021, the game had sold over 6 million copies.

Reception
Super Mario 3D World + Bowser’s Fury was the best-selling game for February 2021 in the United States.

Reviewers noted the game's "experimental" nature, both in its inventive approach to the series' first fully open world, foretelling future Mario games, and its lack of technical polish relative to the series' standards, exemplified by its noticeable drops in framerate and unperfected ideas. The game's foray into a fully open world challenged the Mario tradition of leisurely, "meticulously designed obstacle courses", wrote Polygon, and instead presented as an improvisational rumpus room filled with colorful distractions, messy and warm. On the technical end, the game's framerate drops made Kotaku reviewer desire for more powerful hardware.

Some reviewers were vexed over frequent interruptions of the game's fury event, especially towards the end of the game, but others felt an adrenaline rush at the event's added challenge and unpredictability. After a few hours, Ars Technica found the game repetitive and sparse, returning to the same areas for some challenges with only minor novelty. GameSpot too acknowledged a number of uninspired repeat challenges, exacerbated by the fury event's intrusion while pursuing some of the harder Shine tokens. Polygon appreciated the fury countdown's visibility, likened to the Mario level timers of prior games.

The game was nominated for Best Family Game at The Game Awards 2021.

Notes

References

Further reading

External links
 

2021 video games
Multiplayer and single-player video games
Nintendo Entertainment Planning & Development games
Nintendo Software Technology games
Nintendo Switch games
Nintendo Switch-only games
Open-world video games
Platform games
Super Mario
Video games about reptiles
Video games about size change
Video games developed in the United States
Video games developed in Japan
Super Mario Bros. 35th Anniversary
Video games scored by Daisuke Matsuoka
Video games scored by James Phillipsen
Video games set on fictional islands